Xmal Deutschland (pronounced: /ɪksmal ˈdɔʏtʃlant/), often written as X-Mal Deutschland, was a musical group from Hamburg, West Germany, which existed from 1980 to 1990. Founded in 1980 with a completely female line-up, they became chart hit makers both within, and outside, their native country. The lead singer of the band was vocalist Anja Huwe. Xmal Deutschland's last album was released in 1989.

Biography
Xmal Deutschland was formed in 1980 by Anja Huwe (vocals), Manuela Rickers (guitar), Fiona Sangster (keyboards), Rita Simonsen (bass) and Caro May (drums) in Hamburg, Germany. Their first single, "Schwarze Welt", was released a year later on Alfred Hilsberg’s ZickZack label. The band also contributed to the label compilation Lieber Zuviel Als Zuwenig (ZZ 45). Around this time, Rita Simonsen was replaced by Wolfgang Ellerbrock.

In 1982, the band released the goth classic "Incubus Succubus". Drummer Caro May left the band and formed a new band, and the vacant drummer position was filled by Manuela Zwingmann the same year. While German audiences were less than receptive at first, a United Kingdom tour opening for the Cocteau Twins resulted in a deal with independent label 4AD. Their debut album, Fetisch and the singles "Qual" and "Incubus Succubus II" were released in 1983, all three making the UK Indie Charts, even though the band wrote and performed in German.

"Incubus Succubus" featured in Snowpiercer season 2 episode 9, where the subtitles described it as "upbeat music".

Manuela Zwingmann left the band after one year, being replaced by Peter Bellendir. This lineup, Huwe/Rickers/Sangster/Ellerbrock/Bellendir was the longest lasting. The single "Reigen" and the album Tocsin were released in 1984, followed by a world tour in 1985. Tocsin reached number 86 on the UK Albums Chart.

The Sequenz EP was essentially a remake of a John Peel session, which had been originally recorded on 30 April 1985, and broadcast on 13 May 1985. The EP contained the tracks "Jahr Um Jahr II", "Autumn" (the band's first song with English lyrics, apart from brief snatches of English that appeared in "Qual", "Young Man" and "Tag für Tag") and "Polarlicht" but omitted "Der Wind", which was played at the Peel sessions.

"Matador", produced by Hugh Cornwell of the Stranglers, was released in 1986. Xmal Deutschland also opened for the Stranglers at a concert in Wembley Arena, London, as well as supporting the Stranglers on their entire UK tour. Their follow-up album, Viva was recorded in Hamburg and was released in 1987 through Phonogram, followed by the single "Sickle Moon". Viva contains a large number of English lyrics, including a poem by Emily Dickinson. It was during this time that the band were interviewed by Jack Londoner for the fanzine House of Dolls.

After the release of Viva, Manuela Rickers, Fiona Sangster and Peter Bellendir left the group. Anja Huwe and Wolfgang Ellerbrock continued to work with Frank Z (of Abwärts) on guitar. Producer Henry Staroste played keyboards and studio drummer Curt Cress completed the line-up that recorded the 1989 LP Devils, and the singles "Dreamhouse" and "I'll Be Near You". This also proved to be the last release of Xmal Deutschland, showing a change of direction towards mainstream pop.

The group made a few live appearances in 1990 before eventually disbanding later that same year.

Drummer Peter Bellendir died on February 3, 2013 of severe complications following an organ transplant.

Discography

Albums
 1983: Fetisch (4AD)
 1984: Tocsin (4AD)
 1987: Viva (X-ile (Phonogram))
 1989: Devils (Metronome)

Singles and EPs
 1981: "Schwarze Welt" b/w "Die Wolken", "Großstadfindianer" (Zickzack) 7" single
 1982: "Incubus Succubus" b/w "Zu Jung Zu Alt", "Blut Isst Liebe" (Zickzack/Zickzack Platten) 12" single
 1983 "Incubus Succubus II" b/w "Vilo" (4AD/DRO/Nexus/Nexus International) 7" and 12" single
 1983: "Qual (12" Remix)" b/w "Zelt", "Schnsucht" (4AD/Virgin/Beggars Banquet) 12" single
 1984: "Reigen" b/w "Eiland" (DRO/4AD) 7" single
 1985: "Jahr Um Jahr II" b/w "Autumn", "Polarlicht" -Sequenz (Red Rhino/DRO/Fundamental) 7" and 12" single
 1986: The Peel Sessions (30.04.85) (Strange Fruit) EP
 1986: "Matador" b/w "Paho" (Xile/Mercury) 7" and 12" single/maxi-single
 1987: "Sickle Moon" b/w "Illusion" (Xile/Phonogram/Mercury) 7" and 12" single/maxi-single
 1989: "Dreamhouse" b/w "Drowned You" (Metronome) 7" and 12" single/CD maxi-single
 1989: "I'll Be Near You (Radical Remix)" b/w "The Girl in the Iron Mask", "I'll Be Near You (Retouched Radio Version)" (Metronome) 7" single/12" maxi-single/CD maxi-single

References

External links
 Anja Huwe
 
 
 

4AD artists
German dark wave musical groups
German girl groups
German gothic rock groups
German new wave musical groups
Musical groups established in 1980
Musical groups disestablished in 1990
Musical groups from Hamburg
German post-punk music groups
German alternative rock groups
Dream pop musical groups
Female-fronted musical groups